James Clark (5 February 1891 – 22 November 1963) was a miner and member of the Queensland Legislative Assembly.

Biography
Clark was born in Gympie, Queensland, to parents James Clark and his wife Marion Cathie Clark (née White). He worked as a miner and in 1926 he became an organiser with the Australian Workers' Union.

On the 30th Jun 1919 he married Eileen Russell (died 1975) and together had two sons. He died in November 1963 and was cremated at Mount Thompson Crematorium. He was a member Ancient Order of Druids.

Political career
Clark, representing the Labor, was the member for Fitzroy from 1935 until the seat was abolished in 1960. During that time he was the Chairman of Committees from 1953 until 1957. He was also secretary of the Mount Morgan Hospital.

References

Members of the Queensland Legislative Assembly
1891 births
1963 deaths
20th-century Australian politicians